The 2013 Nordic Futsal Cup was held from December 4 to 7, 2013 in Nykøbing Falster, Denmark. Sweden won the tournament.

Final standings

Matches

Goalscorers
6 goals
  Kevin Jørgensen

4 goals
  Kristian Legiec

3 goals
  Miika Hosio
  Mikko Kytölä

2 goals

  Jacob Bonde
  Panu Autio
  Abdurahim Laajab
  Christopher Moen
  Sargon Abraham
  Mathias Etéus
  Dan Mönell

1 goal

  Sebastian Jensen
  Rasmus Lucht
  Rasmus Petersen
  Niko Stenholm
  Antti Teittinen
  Eirik Valla Dønnem
  Kim Rune Ovesen
  Morten Ravlo
  Erlend Skaga
  Stian Sortevik
  Thomas Sæther
  Simon Chekroun
  Pejman Pahlevan

Awards 

 Most Valuable Player

 Top Scorer
  Kevin Jørgensen (6 goals)
 Fair-Play Award

References

External links 
 Futsal Planet

Nordic Futsal Cup
2013
2013–14 in European futsal
2013–14 in Danish football
2013 in Norwegian football
2013 in Swedish football
2013 in Finnish football